Lac de la Case is a lake at Bernex in Haute-Savoie, France.

Case